Solomon Islands National Council of Women is a non-governmental women's organisation based in Honiara, in the Solomon Islands. It was founded in 1983

It has received funding from the Global Fund for Women

Purpose
The Council was founded to represent women in the Solomon Islands, with a vision of "Women as Equal Partners in the Development of Solomon Islands". It encourages the participation of women in decision-making on the Islands.

Objectives
The objectives of the organisation are as follows:
Promote and coordinate activities for women throughout Solomon Islands;
Act as a representative body for women to the Solomon Islands Government (SIG) and other entities;
Advise the SIG on policies and issues of concern to women;
Undertake awareness and advocacy on international relevant instruments;
Provide a forum through which women can have a voice on issues affecting them;
Encourage participation of women in decision making processes and bodies;
Promote awareness at all levels women's concerns; and
Promote formation of effective partnerships with other entities as appropriate.

The Council's guiding values are "leadership with inclusiveness, passion, wisdom, commitment, pro-activeness, ownership, transparency, competitiveness, trust, creativity and innovation"

References

Non-profit organisations based in the Solomon Islands
1983 establishments in the Solomon Islands
Organizations established in 1983
Women's organisations based in the Solomon Islands